Dametto is an Italian surname. Notable people with the surname include:

Giancarlo Dametto (born 1959), Italian volleyball player
Nick Dametto (born 1983), Australian politician
Paolo Dametto (born 1993), Italian footballer

Italian-language surnames